Jimi Blue Ochsenknecht (born 27 December 1991) is a German actor and musician.

Early life 
Ochsenknecht was born in Munich to actor Uwe Ochsenknecht and actress Natascha Ochsenknecht. He has an older brother, Wilson Gonzalez Ochsenknecht and a younger sister, Cheyenne Savannah. He also has an older half-brother, Rocco, from a previous relationship of his father. He is an uncle to Rocco's daughter Amelia (born 2013).

Career 
In Germany, Ochsenknecht works as actor in film and television productions. He is best known for his role as character Leon in German production Die Wilden Kerle. This film is based on the children's book series Die Wilden Fußballkerle (The Wild Soccer Bunch) by Joachim Masannek, who also directed the film.

Filmography 

 2000: Enlightenment Guaranteed
 2003: 
 2005: Auf den Spuren der Vergangenheit (TV film)
 2005: 
 2006: 
 2007: 
 2008: 
 2008: 
 2009: 
 2011: Homies
 2012: Der Kriminalist: Schamlos (TV)
 2012: Star Race
 2012: Kleine Morde
 2012: Notruf Hafenkante: Wutbürger (TV), as Luiz
 2013: SPOT "No Loverboys"
 2014: Die Familiendetektivin: Der verlorene Sohn (TV)
 2016: The Old Fox: Machtgefühle (TV)
 2016: 
 2016: Unter anderen Umständen: Das Versprechen (TV)

Awards 
 2004: Undine Award – Best film debutant for The Wild Soccer Bunch
 2005: Bravo Otto in bronze – Category cinema stars male
 2006: Bravo Otto in silver – Category actor
 2007: Bravo Otto in gold – Category singer; and bronze – Category actor
 2007: Jetix Award Coolster TV-star
 2008: Steiger Award 2008 Nachwuchs
 2008: New Faces Award
 2009: DIVA AWARD – New Talent of the Year 2008
 2010: ECHO Gold Award for the Album "Mission Blue"

Music 
 January 2008: Mission Blue (studio album)
 October 2008: Sick Like That (studio album)

External links 

 Jimi Blue Ochsenknecht on universal-music.de (in German)
 
 

Male actors from Munich
1991 births
Living people
German male television actors
German male film actors
German male child actors
Audi Sport TT Cup drivers
21st-century German male  singers